Verica Trstenjak (born December 9, 1962) is a Slovenian Doctor of Laws and Professor of European Law. From 2006 to 2012 she has been an Advocate General at the Court of Justice of the European Union in Luxembourg, from 2004 to 2006 judge of the General Court.


Early legal work 
Verica Trstenjak passed her bar exam in 1987 and obtained her doctor's degree at the Faculty of Law of the University of Ljubljana in 1995. She worked as a head of the legal service at the Ministry of Science and Technology of the Republic of Slovenia between 1994 and 1996, and as State Secretary at the same ministry between 1996 and 2000. In 2000 she held a post of a Secretary-General of the Government of the Republic of Slovenia.

She has cooperated also with non-governmental organizations in Slovenia and contributed to preparation of Foundations Act. From 1997 to 2000 she was also a leader of the working group 17 for the accession negotiations of Slovenia with EU.

Work in professorships 
Verica Trstenjak pursued her doctoral studies at the University of Zürich (Universität Zürich), the Institute of Comparative Law of the University of Vienna (Institut für Rechtsvergleichung der Universität Wien), the Max Planck Institute for Private International Law in Hamburg (Max-Planck-Institut für Internationales Privatrecht), and the Free University of Amsterdam (Vrije Universiteit Amsterdam). In 1996 she became a professor for Theory of Law and State and Private Law, and in 2006 a full professor (venia legendi) for Civil and European Law.

She was a visiting professor at the universities of Vienna (Universität Wien), Freiburg (Germany) (Universität Freiburg), Bucerius Law School in Hamburg and at the universities in Heidelberg, Bonn, Salzburg, Zürich, Liechtenstein, Amsterdam (University of Amsterdam), Luxembourg, Haag and Ferrara. She gave various lectures outside the EU at the universities in Sydney, Los Angeles, San Francisco and New York. Until 2006 she was a member of the Study Group on a European Civil Code.

She has published more than 300 legal articles and several books on European and private law; she gives speeches at numerous international conferences in Slovenia and abroad (e.g. conferences on Common Frame of Reference (Münster, Osnabrück, Trier); Luxembourg: European Jurists' Forum 2011; Trier: Jahrestagung der Gesellschaft für Rechtsvergleichung 2011; Berlin: Humboldt-Universität, 2012; Salzburg: 24. Europäische Notarentage, 2012; Barcelona: European Jurists' Forum 2013, Vienna: General Reporter at IACL - International Academy of Comparative Law, 2014; Amsterdam: Keynote Speaker at International Conference of Consumer Law, 2015).

She is a visiting professor of Masters Study (Litigation in EU Intellectual Property Rights) at the University of Luxembourg until 2013 and of Masters Study (Evropsko civilno pravo/European Civil Law, Primerjalno pravo in veliki pravni sistemi/Comparative Law and the great Legal Systems, Pravosodni sistem Evropske unije/Judicial System of the European Union) at the European Law Faculty (Evropska pravna fakulteta) in Nova Gorica, Slovenia as well as at the University of Vienna (since 2015).

After her mandate at the CJEU had ended she was appointed Professor of European Law at the Law Faculty of the University of Vienna (Rechtswissenschaftliche Fakultät, Universität Wien) in 2013 (until 2018). Furthermore she holds lectures at the universities of Ljubljana and Maribor. She teaches at the summer schools in Salzburg (University of Salzburg), Strobl (University of Vienna) and Alpbach (Leopold-Franzens-University-Innsbruck).

In 2012 she was appointed external scientific member of the newly established Max Planck Institute Luxembourg for International, European and Regulatory Procedural Law in Luxembourg. Since 2017 she is a member of the Management and Executive Board of the FRA - European Union Agency for Fundamental Rights as well as the Advisory Committee (a kind of arbitration court) of the international law organisation Energy Community (since 2015).

Hans-Wolfgang Micklitz, professor at the European University Institute in Florence, named Verica Trstenjak as "the founding mother of European private law."

Societies and honors 
Member of Editorial boards of a number of legal periodicals in Slovenia and abroad:

 European Law Review (ELR)
 European Journal of Consumer Law
 Zeitschrift für Europäisches Unternehmens- und Verbraucherrecht (EUVR)
 Zeitschrift für Europäisches Privatrecht (ZEuP) (correspondence member)
 European Journal of Commercial Contract Law (EJCCL)
 Pravnik

Member of Scientific boards:

 International Advisory Board of the Alexander von Humboldt-Foundation (from October 2015 on)
 Scientific Advisory Board at the Faculty of Law of the University of Vienna
 Beirat des Instituts für Stiftungsrecht und das Recht der Non-Profit-Organisationen (Bucerius Law School) in Hamburg

Member of a number of Lawyers' Associations:

 Academia Europaea
 Slovensko društvo za Evropsko pravo (Slovene Association for European Law) (president)
 European Law Institute (founding member)
 Zivilrechtslehrervereinigung
 International Academy of Comparative Law (IACL)
 l'Association Henri Capitant des Amis de la Culture Juridique Française
 Gesellschaft für Rechtsvergleichung
 ISTR – International Society for Third-Sector Research

In 2003 she won a prize of the Association of Slovene Lawyers, 'Lawyer of the Year 2003'.

She is Dame of Honor of the Order of St. George.

Work at the Court of Justice of the EU 

She worked as a judge at the Court of First Instance of the European Communities (now General Court) from 7 July 2004 to 6 October 2006 and was an Advocate General at the Court of Justice of the European Union from 7 October 2006 to 28 November 2012.

Selection of some relevant published articles 

 Trstenjak Verica/Weingerl Petra (ed): The Influence of Human Rights and Basic Rights in Private Law, Springer International Switzerland (2016).
 Trstenjak Verica: Les mécanismes de recours collectif et leur importance pour la protection des consommateurs, in La Cour de justice de l'Union européenne sous la présidence de Vassilios Skouris (2003-2015), Liber amicorum Vassilios Skouris (2015), pp. 681–696.
 Trstenjak Verica/Beysen Erwin: The Growing Overlap of Fundamental Freedoms and Fundamental Rights in the Case-law of the CJEU, European Law Review (2013) 38, S. 293-315 (Social Sciences Citation Index)
 Procedural Aspects of European Consumer Protection Law and the Case Law of the CJEU, European Review of Private Law, No. 2/ 2013, S. 451-478
 Pravo EU, Ustavno, procesno in gospodarsko pravo EU, GV Založba, Ljubljana, 2012, 840 S, together with Maja Brkan
 Trstenjak, Verica, Beysen, Erwin, European consumer protection law: curia semper dabit remedium?. Published in: Common market law review, 2011, Vol. 48, No. 1, pp. 95–124.
 Das Verhältnis zwischen Immaterialgüterrecht und Datenschutzrecht in der Informationsgesellschaft im Lichte der Rechtsprechung des Europäischen Gerichtshofs. Published in: Gewerblicher Rechtsschutz und Urheberrecht, Internationaler Teil (GRUR Int) (published in 2012)
 Verbraucherschutzrecht und die rechtlichen Probleme des Internetverkaufs in der Rechtsprechung des EuGH. Published in: Borić, Lurger, Schwarzenegger, Terlitza (ed.), Öffnung und Wandel – Die internationale Dimension des Rechts II, Festschrift für Prof. Willibald Posch, LexisNexis, Wien, 2011, pp. 787–798.
 L'importance du Code civil et des Provinces illyriennes pour la Slovénie. Published in: Revue international de droit comparé, No. 3/2011, pp. 720–725.
 Von der Mindest- zur Vollharmonisierung: Bedeutung für die Rechtsprechung des EuGH. Published in: Welser, Rudolf (ed.), Konsumentenschutz in Zentral- und Osteuropa, Wien, 2010, pp. 205–219.
 Private law developments in Slovenia: a European perspective. Published in: Jessel-Holst, Christa (ed.), Kulms, Rainer (ed.), Trunk, Alexander (ed.). Private law in Eastern Europe: autonomous developments or legal transplants?, (Materialien zum ausländischen und internationalen Privatrecht, 50). Tübingen: M. Siebeck, cop. 2010, pp. 123–147.
 Les difficultés d'une interprétation et d'une application unitaires du droit communautaire. Published in: Le contrat en Europe aujourd'hui et demain (ed. Rémy Cabrillac, Denis Mazeaud, André Prüm), Société de législation comparée, Paris, 2008, pp. 147–175. 
 Slowenisches Zivilrecht: Vom ABGB auf dem Weg zum europäischen Zivilgesetzbuch? Published in: Privatrechtsentwicklung in Zentral- und Osteuropa (ed. Rudolf Welser), MANZ'sche Verlag, Wien, 2008, p. 101–114.
 Die Auslegung privatrechtlicher Richtlinien durch den EuGH: ein Rechtsprechungsbericht unter Berücksichtigung des Common Frame of Reference. Published in: Zeitschrift für Europäisches Privatrecht, 2007, pp. 145–160.
 La Slovenia e l'armonizzazione del diritto sloveno con quello dell'Unione europea: il diritto civile sloveno e il nuovo diritto delle obbligazioni. Published in: Contratto e impresa. Europa, IX (2004), No. 1, pp. 265–292.

Selection of relevant cases 

1.	Consumer protection

Pénzügyi Lízing (C-137/08) – Unfair terms in consumer contracts
Aventis Pasteur (C-358/08) –Liability for defective products
Pammer (C 585/08) and Hotel Alpenhof (C 144/09) – Jurisdiction in civil and commercial matters
Quelle (C-404/06) – Absence of duty to pay compensation to the vendor for the use of defective goods in case of rescission of the contract
VTB-VAB (C-261/07) and Galatea (C-299/07) – Combined offers
Mediaprint Zeitungs- und Zeitschriftenverlag (C-540/08) – Combined offers

2.	Social and labour law

Schultz-Hoff (C-350/06) and Stringer (C-520/06); KHS (C-214/10) – Right to paid annual leave of sick employees
Dominguez (C-282/10) – The doctrine of ‚Drittwirkung der Grundrechte’, general principles of law
CLECE (C-463/09) – Transfers of undertakings

3.	Intellectual property law

SGAE (C-467/08) – Compensation of intellectual property right holders
Painer (C-145/10)
Fachverband der Buch- und Medienwirtschaft/LIBRO (C-531/07)
Phonographic Performance (Ireland) (C-162/10) – copyright and related rights (rights of performers and phonogram producers)
SCF Consorzio Fonografici (C-135/10) – copyright and related rights (rights of performers and phonogram producers)

4.	Corporate law

Audiolux (C-101/08) – Criteria for the recognition of general principles of law
Idryma Typou (C-81/09) – Criteria of demarcation between the freedom of establishment and the freedom of movement of capital
Commission/Spain (C-338/06) – Right of pre-emption for shares and for bonds convertible into shares

5.	Public procurement

Commission/Germany (C-503/04) – Obligation to rescind a contract
Commission/Germany (C-536/07) – Köln Messe
Commission/Germany (C-160/08) – Ambulance services
Commission/Germany (C-271/08) – Collective agreement on the conversion of earnings for local authority employees
Commission/Austria (C-28/09) – Sectoral traffic prohibition for lorries

6.	Immigration and asylum law

NS (C-411/10) and ME (C-493/10) – Right of asylum in the European Union

7.	Health policy

Hecht-Pharma (C-140/07) – Classification as a medicinal product
MSD Sharp & Dohme (C-316/09) – Advertising of medicinal products on the Internet
Commission/Portugal (C-255/09) – Cross-border healthcare services

8.	Other

Koller (C-118/09) – Education and training of lawyers (Mutual recognition of diplomas)

See also

List of members of the European Court of Justice

References

External links
 English Homepage of Verica Trstenjak at the University of Vienna
 Court of Justice of the European Union
 Slovene Association for European Law
 Universität Zürich
 Institut für Rechtsvergleichung der Universität Wien
 Max-Planck-Institut für Internationales Privatrecht
 Vrije Universiteit Amsterdam
 Universität Wien
 Albert-Ludwigs-Universität Freiburg
 Bucerius Law School
 Gesellschaft für Rechtsvergleichung
 International Academy of Comparative law
 European Law Institute

1962 births
Living people
University of Ljubljana alumni
Academic staff of the University of Maribor
Academic staff of the University of Vienna
Secretary-Generals of the Government of Slovenia
20th-century Slovenian lawyers
21st-century Slovenian judges
Advocates General of the European Court of Justice
Secretaries-general
Slovenian officials of the European Union